Lombardy elected its second delegation to the Italian Senate on June 7, 1953. This election was a part of national Italian general election of 1953 even if, according to the Italian Constitution, every senatorial challenge in each Region is a single and independent race.

The election was won by the centrist Christian Democracy, as it happened at national level. All Lombard provinces gave a majority or at least a plurality to the winning party.

Background
Alcide De Gasperi's Christian Democracy weakened in this election, after that the exceptional conditions of 1948 had expired. However, Lombardy remained a stronghold for the national leading party.

Communists and Socialists obtained more votes running divided than they did together five years before, absorbing most of the Republican electorate. Even if the Communists obtained some seats in the agricultural south, the Socialists remarked their strength in the Milanese industrial neighbourhood. The Italian Democratic Socialist Party obtained a seat in Milan, a city led by its mayor Virgilio Ferrari, while the rightist and anti-constitutional Italian Social Movement and the Monarchist National Party took away some Conservative votes from the Christian Democracy and obtained their first seats in the bourgeois centers of Milan and Como.

Electoral system
The electoral system introduced in 1948 for the newly elected Senate was a strange hybrid which established a form of proportional representation into FPTP-like constituencies. A candidate needed a landslide victory of more than 65% of votes to obtain a direct mandate. All constituencies where this result was not reached entered into an at-large calculation based upon the D'Hondt method to distribute the seats between the parties, and candidates with the best percentages of suffrages inside their party list were elected.

Results

|-
|- bgcolor="#E9E9E9"
!rowspan="1" align="left" valign="top"|Party
!rowspan="1" align="center" valign="top"|votes
!rowspan="1" align="center" valign="top"|votes (%)
!rowspan="1" align="center" valign="top"|seats
!rowspan="1" align="center" valign="top"|swing
|-
!align="left" valign="top"|Christian Democracy
|valign="top"|1,739,691
|valign="top"|46.7
|valign="top"|16
|valign="top"|2
|-
!align="left" valign="top"|Italian Communist Party
|valign="top"|678,804
|valign="top"|18.2
|valign="top"|6
|valign="top"|1
|-
!align="left" valign="top"|Italian Socialist Party
|valign="top"|648,787
|valign="top"|17.4
|valign="top"|6
|valign="top"|1
|-
!align="left" valign="top"|Italian Democratic Socialist Party
|valign="top"|215,196
|valign="top"|5.8
|valign="top"|1
|valign="top"|=
|-
!align="left" valign="top"|Italian Social Movement
|valign="top"|140,327
|valign="top"|3.8
|valign="top"|1
|valign="top"|1
|-
!align="left" valign="top"|Monarchist National Party
|valign="top"|124,905
|valign="top"|3.6
|valign="top"|1
|valign="top"|1
|-
!align="left" valign="top"|Others
|valign="top"|175,418
|valign="top"|4.7
|valign="top"|-
|valign="top"|2
|- bgcolor="#E9E9E9"
!rowspan="1" align="left" valign="top"|Total parties
!rowspan="1" align="right" valign="top"|3,723,128
!rowspan="1" align="right" valign="top"|100.0
!rowspan="1" align="right" valign="top"|31
!rowspan="1" align="right" valign="top"|=
|}

Sources: Italian Ministry of the Interior

Constituencies

|-
|- bgcolor="#E9E9E9"
!align="left" valign="top"|N°
!align="center" valign="top"|Constituency
!align="center" valign="top"|Elected
!align="center" valign="top"|Party
!align="center" valign="top"|Votes %
!align="center" valign="top"|Others
|-
|align="left"|1
|align="left"|Bergamo
|align="left"|Cristoforo Pezzini
|align="left"|Christian Democracy
|align="left"|61.8%
|align="left"|
|-
|align="left"|2
|align="left"|Clusone
|align="left"|Pietro Bellora
|align="left"|Christian Democracy
|align="left"|70.7%
|align="left"|
|-
|align="left"|3
|align="left"|Treviglio
|align="left"|Daniele Turani
|align="left"|Christian Democracy
|align="left"|63.4%
|align="left"|
|-
|align="left"|4
|align="left"|Brescia
|align="left"|Angelo Buizza
|align="left"|Christian Democracy
|align="left"|48.6%
|align="left"|
|-
|align="left"|5
|align="left"|Breno
|align="left"|Angelo Cemmi
|align="left"|Christian Democracy
|align="left"|64.1%
|align="left"|
|-
|align="left"|6
|align="left"|Chiari
|align="left"|Pietro Cenini
|align="left"|Christian Democracy
|align="left"|58.6%
|align="left"|
|-
|align="left"|7
|align="left"|Salò
|align="left"|Francesco Zane
|align="left"|Christian Democracy
|align="left"|54.0%
|align="left"|
|-
|align="left"|8
|align="left"|Como
|align="left"|Attilio Terragni
|align="left"|Monarchist National Party
|align="left"|6.8%
|align="left"|Giuseppe Terragni (DC) 46.1%
|-
|align="left"|9
|align="left"|Lecco
|align="left"|Pietro Amigoni
|align="left"|Christian Democracy
|align="left"|58.4%
|align="left"|
|-
|align="left"|10
|align="left"|Cantù
|align="left"|Lorenzo Spallino
|align="left"|Christian Democracy
|align="left"|56.3%
|align="left"|
|-
|align="left"|11
|align="left"|Cremona
|align="left"|Antonio Banfi
|align="left"|Italian Communist Party
|align="left"|25.6%
|align="left"|
|-
|align="left"|12
|align="left"|Crema
|align="left"|Ennio Zelioli
|align="left"|Christian Democracy
|align="left"|52.7%
|align="left"|
|-
|align="left"|13
|align="left"|Mantua
|align="left"|Alceo Negri
|align="left"|Italian Socialist Party
|align="left"|25.2%
|align="left"|Clarenzo Menotti (PCI) 21.2%
|-
|align="left"|14
|align="left"|Ostiglia
|align="left"|Arturo ColombiRodolfo Morandi
|align="left"|Italian Communist PartyItalian Socialist Party
|align="left"|29.3%27.1%
|align="left"|
|-
|align="left"|15
|align="left"|Milan 1
|align="left"|Mario Marina
|align="left"|Italian Social Movement
|align="left"|8.6% 
|align="left"|
|-
|align="left"|16
|align="left"|Milan 2
|align="left"|None elected
|align="left"|
|align="left"|
|align="left"|
|-
|align="left"|17
|align="left"|Milan 3
|align="left"|None elected
|align="left"|
|align="left"|
|align="left"|
|-
|align="left"|18
|align="left"|Milan 4
|align="left"|Emilio Canevari
|align="left"|Italian Democratic Socialist Party
|align="left"|9.9%
|align="left"|
|-
|align="left"|19
|align="left"|Milan 5
|align="left"|None elected
|align="left"|
|align="left"|
|align="left"|
|-
|align="left"|20
|align="left"|Milan 6
|align="left"|Piero MontagnaniFrancesco Mariani
|align="left"|Italian Communist PartyItalian Socialist Party
|align="left"|31.0%22.5%
|align="left"|
|-
|align="left"|21
|align="left"|Abbiategrasso
|align="left"|Giorgio Marzola
|align="left"|Italian Socialist Party
|align="left"|21.7%
|align="left"|Emanuele Samek Lodovici (DC) 46.0%
|-
|align="left"|22
|align="left"|Rho
|align="left"|Carlo CortiAmilcare Locatelli
|align="left"|Christian DemocracyItalian Socialist Party
|align="left"|49.7%19.7%
|align="left"|
|-
|align="left"|23
|align="left"|Monza
|align="left"|Mario Longoni
|align="left"|Christian Democracy
|align="left"|50.8%
|align="left"|
|-
|align="left"|24
|align="left"|Vimercate
|align="left"|Cesare MerzagoraGiuseppe Roda
|align="left"|Christian Democracy (Indep.)Italian Socialist Party
|align="left"|56.2%19.2%
|align="left"|
|-
|align="left"|25
|align="left"|Lodi
|align="left"|Gianmaria Cornaggia
|align="left"|Christian Democracy
|align="left"|47.1%
|align="left"|
|-
|align="left"|26
|align="left"|Pavia
|align="left"|Giovanni Farina
|align="left"|Italian Communist Party
|align="left"|26.6%
|align="left"|
|-
|align="left"|27
|align="left"|Voghera
|align="left"|Cesare Gavina
|align="left"|Italian Communist Party
|align="left"|23.9%
|align="left"|Enrico Gazzale (PNM) 6.6%
|-
|align="left"|28
|align="left"|Vigevano
|align="left"|Giuseppe Alberganti
|align="left"|Italian Communist Party
|align="left"|34.1%
|align="left"|
|-
|align="left"|29
|align="left"|Sondrio
|align="left"|Ezio Vanoni
|align="left"|Christian Democracy
|align="left"|62.6%
|align="left"|
|-
|align="left"|30
|align="left"|Varese
|align="left"|None elected
|align="left"|
|align="left"|
|align="left"|
|-
|align="left"|31
|align="left"|Busto Arsizio 
|align="left"|Natale Santero
|align="left"|Christian Democracy
|align="left"|48.2%
|align="left"|Mario Grampa (PSI) 19.1%
|}

Senators with a direct mandate have bold percentages. Please remember that the electoral system was, in the other cases, a form of proportional representation and not a FPTP race: so candidates winning with a simple plurality could have (and usually had) a candidate (always a Christian democrat) with more votes in their constituency.

Substitutions
Mario Grampa for Busto Arsizio (19.1%) replaced Rodolfo Morandi in 1955. Reason: death.
Emanuele Samek Lodovici for Abbiategrasso (46.0%) replaced Ezio Vanoni in 1956. Reason: death.
Giuseppe Terragni for Como (46.1%) replaced Carlo Corti in 1957. Reason: resignation.
Clarenzo Menotti for Mantua (21.2%) replaced Antonio Banfi in 1957. Reason: death.
Enrico Gazzale for Voghera (6.6%) replaced Attilio Terragni in 1958. Reason: death.

Notes

Elections in Lombardy
1953 elections in Italy